Sasha Olson (born September 23, 1976) is a Canadian softball outfielder, and member of Canada women's national softball team for 4 years.

Olson began playing softball at age 17, and is a graduate of Simon Fraser University. She was a part of the Canadian Softball team who finished 5th at the 2004 Summer Olympics

References

1976 births
Sportspeople from British Columbia
Canadian people of Swedish descent
Canadian softball players
Living people
Olympic softball players of Canada
Simon Fraser University alumni
Softball players at the 2004 Summer Olympics